Esmé Whittaker is a British art historian and curator. 

Whittaker attended the University of Bristol, obtaining a bachelor's degree in Art History. She received a master's degree, and then a doctorate from the Courtauld Institute of Art for her dissertation The Arts and Crafts house in the Lake District: buildings, landscapes and communities, under the supervision of Professor Caroline Arscott. This work elucidated the influence of William Wordsworth and John Ruskin on the Arts and Crafts houses in the Lake District, and has been lauded.

Her book (co-written with Matthew Hyde) Arts and Crafts Houses in the Lake District won the 2015 Bookends Prizes for Arts and Literature.

Whittaker worked at the Word & Image Department of the Victoria and Albert Museum. She also assisted in exhibitions, including The Cult of Beauty - The Aesthetic Movement 1860-1900 (2011).

In 2011, Whittaker curated an exhibition on William Morris at Two Temple Place.

In 2017, she appeared in the BBC Four documentary In Search of Arcadia.

Whittaker worked asa curator for the English Heritage's Chiswick House and Marble Hill House.

Selected works

References 

Living people
Alumni of the Courtauld Institute of Art
Year of birth missing (living people)